The 2022 Copa Sudamericana Final was the final match which decided the winner of the 2022 Copa Sudamericana. This was the 21st edition of the Copa Sudamericana, the second-tier South American continental club football tournament organized by CONMEBOL.

The match was played on 1 October 2022 between Brazilian club São Paulo and Ecuadorian club Independiente del Valle, and it was originally scheduled to be played at Estádio Nacional Mané Garrincha in Brasília, Brazil, however, on 23 June 2022 CONMEBOL announced that a change of venue was requested by the Brazilian Football Confederation due to the 2022 Brazilian general election taking place one day after the date of the match. Following consultations between the members of CONMEBOL's Council, Estadio Mario Alberto Kempes in Córdoba, Argentina, which previously hosted the final match of the 2020 Copa Sudamericana, was selected as the new venue for the match.

Independiente del Valle defeated São Paulo by a 2–0 score in the final to win their second title in the tournament. As winners of the 2022 Copa Sudamericana, they earned the right to play against the winners of the 2022 Copa Libertadores in the 2023 Recopa Sudamericana. They also automatically qualified for the 2023 Copa Libertadores group stage.

Teams

Road to the final

Note: In all scores below, the score of the home team is given first.

Match

Details

See also 
 2022 Copa Libertadores Final
 2023 Recopa Sudamericana

References

External links 
 CONMEBOL.com

2022
Final
2022 in South American football
October 2022 sports events in Argentina
Copa Sudamericana Finals 2022
Copa Sudamericana Finals 2022